The 1995 Canoe Slalom World Cup was a series of five races in 4 canoeing and kayaking categories organized by the International Canoe Federation (ICF). It was the 8th edition. The series consisted of 4 regular world cup races and the world cup final.

Calendar

Final standings 

The winner of each world cup race was awarded 25 points. The points scale reached down to 1 point for 15th place. Only the best two results of each athlete from the first 4 world cups plus the result from the world cup final counted for the final world cup standings.

Results

World Cup Race 1 

The first world cup race of the season took place at the Prague-Troja Canoeing Centre, Czech Republic from 24 to 25 June.

World Cup Race 2 

The second world cup race of the season took place at the Tacen Whitewater Course, Slovenia from 1 to 2 July.

World Cup Race 3 

The third world cup race of the season took place in Mezzana, Italy from 8 to 9 July.

World Cup Race 4 

The fourth world cup race of the season took place in Lofer, Austria from 15 to 16 July.

World Cup Final 

The final world cup race of the season took place at the Ocoee Whitewater Center, Tennessee from 29 September to 1 October.

References

External links 
 International Canoe Federation

Canoe Slalom World Cup
1995 in canoeing